King Missile is the sixth studio album by the experimental music band King Missile, released on April 19, 1994 by Atlantic Records.

Reception

Brian Flota of AllMusic awarded the album three out of five stars and said "the eponymous final release by the second version of King Missile features the same witty and hilarious John S. Hall lyrical and spoken word moments alongside the lackluster pop filler that padded out their previous five albums." Trouser Press said "the music is unassailable (Rick does his part with several hair-raising noise-fuzz-wah-guitar solos), but — with the exception of "The Dishwasher," an extraordinary multi-leveled evocation of the post-stress syndrome crime-fearing urbanites endure daily — the album draws close to self-parody."

Track listing

Personnel
Adapted from the King Missile liner notes.

King Missile
 John S. Hall – lead vocals
 Roger Murdock – drums, percussion, guitar (12), bodhrán (16), piano (17)
 Dave Rick – guitar, backing vocals, bass guitar (16)
 Chris Xefos – bass guitar, keyboards, backing vocals

Additional performers
 Chuck Marcus – guitar (12)

Production and design
 Greg Calbi – mastering
 Bryce Goggin – assistant engineer
 Danny Kadar – engineering
 Lance Laurie – cover art
 Ray Lego – photographer
 Chris Lewis – engineering
 Kim Rancourt – art direction, design
 Daniel Rey – production

Release history

References

External links 
 
 
 King Missile at iTunes

King Missile albums
Atlantic Records albums
1994 albums
Albums produced by Daniel Rey